During the American Civil War, Arkansas was a Confederate state, though it had initially voted to remain in the Union. Following the capture of Fort Sumter in April 1861, Abraham Lincoln called for troops from every Union state to put down the rebellion, and Arkansas and several other states seceded. For the rest of the civil war, Arkansas played a major role in controlling the Mississippi River, a major waterway.

Arkansas raised 48 infantry regiments, 20 artillery batteries, and over 20 cavalry regiments for the Confederacy, mostly serving in the Western Theater, though the Third Arkansas served with distinction in the Army of Northern Virginia. Major-General Patrick Cleburne was the state's most notable military leader. The state also supplied four infantry regiments, four cavalry regiments and one artillery battery of white troops for the Union and six infantry regiments and one artillery battery of "U.S. Colored Troops."

Numerous skirmishes as well as several significant battles were fought in Arkansas, including the Battle of Elkhorn Tavern in March 1862, a decisive one for the Trans-Mississippi Theater which ensured Union control of northern Arkansas. The state capitol at Little Rock was captured in 1863. By the end of the war, programs such as the draft, high taxes, and martial law had led to a decline in enthusiasm for the Confederate cause. Arkansas was officially readmitted to the Union in 1868.

Background
Arkansas was a member of the Confederacy during the war, and provided troops, supplies, and military and political leaders. Arkansas became the 25th state of the United States on June 15, 1836, entering as a slave state. Some of antebellum Arkansas was still a wilderness in most areas, rural and sparsely populated.  Slavery had existed in the area since French/Spanish colonial times, but had been limited in scale until after statehood.  Plantation style agriculture had taken hold in the areas of the state that had easy access to water transportation for moving cash crops, like cotton, to market. Counties bordering the Mississippi, Arkansas, White, Saline, and Ouachita rivers had the highest slave populations.  Slavery existed but on a much smaller scale in the mountainous northwest and north central parts of the state. The 1850s had seen rapid economic growth in the state.

News of John Brown's Raid in Virginia in 1859 had spurred a renewed interest in the state's militia system which had been virtually dormant since the end of the War with Mexico. Like most of the United States, Arkansas had an organized militia system before the Civil War. State law required military service of most male inhabitants of a certain age. By August 1860 the state's militia consisted of 62 regiments divided into eight brigades, which comprised an eastern division and a western division. New regiments were added as the militia organization developed. Additionally, many counties and cities raised uniformed volunteer companies, which drilled more often and were better equipped than the un-uniformed militia. These volunteer companies were instrumental in the seizure of federal installations at Little Rock and Fort Smith, beginning in February 1861 before Arkansas actually seceded.

During the Presidential Election of 1860, Abraham Lincoln was not even on the ballot in Arkansas.  The state voted for Southern Democratic Party candidate John C. Breckinridge, of Kentucky.

The secession crisis

Abraham Lincoln's victory in the presidential election of 1860 triggered South Carolina's declaration of secession from the Union. By February 1861, six more Southern states made similar declarations. On February 7, the seven states adopted a provisional constitution and established their temporary capital at Montgomery, Alabama. A pre-war February Peace Conference of 1861 met in Washington in a failed attempt at resolving the crisis.

As the secession movement grew, people in Arkansas became greatly concerned. In January 1861 the General Assembly called an election for the people to vote on whether Arkansas should hold a convention to consider secession. At the same time the voters were to elect delegates to the convention in case the vote should be favorable. On February 18, 1861, Arkansans voted to call a secession convention, but elected mostly Unionist delegates.

Rector and the arsenal crisis 

Secessionist forces began calling for the seizure of the Federal Arsenal in Little Rock. When rumors were circulated that the Federal Government intended to reinforce the troops at the Little Rock Arsenal, the leading citizens of Helena sent Governor Henry M. Rector a telegram volunteering 500 men to assist in its seizure. Edmund Burgevin, adjutant general of Arkansas, carried the message to the Governor. Burgevin complained of the impropriety of a direct offer of volunteers to the governor of a State which had not seceded, and might not secede. Governor Rector's response was:

In response to the Governor's message, militia companies began assembling in Little Rock by February 5, 1861, and they made their intention to seize the Arsenal known to its commander, Captain James Totten. Eventually more than a thousand militiamen would assemble, representing Phillips, Jefferson, Prairie, White, Saline, Hot Spring, Montgomery, Monroe, and St. Francis counties.  Although generally opposed to secession, the Little Rock City Council feared that a battle might ensue within the city itself and passed an ordinance requesting the Governor assume control of the assembling volunteer forces and to seize the Arsenal "to prevent the effusion of blood".

Governor Rector, now armed with the city council's request, took control of the military situation. With militia forces now surrounding the arsenal grounds, Governor Rector dispatched General Thomas D. Merrick, commander of the First Division, Arkansas Militia, with a formal demand for the Arsenal's surrender.  Captain Totten, Arsenal commander, agreed to evacuate the Arsenal in return for safe passage out of the state. Governor Rector agreed and the Militia took control of the Arsenal on February 8, 1861.  Later, artillery batteries were set up at Helena on the Mississippi River and Pine Bluff on the Arkansas to prevent reinforcement of Federal military posts.

Arkansas Secession Convention 

On March 4, 1861, Lincoln was sworn in as President. In his inaugural address, he argued that the Constitution was a "more perfect union" than the earlier Articles of Confederation and Perpetual Union, that it was a binding contract, and called any secession "legally void". He stated he had no intent to invade the Southern states, nor did he intend to end slavery where it existed, but that he would use force to maintain possession of federal property belonging to the United States. His speech closed with a plea for restoration of the bonds of union.

The next day, the Arkansas Secession Convention convened at the State House in Little Rock. Judge David Walker, who opposed secession, was elected its president. The convention continued in session for two and a half weeks. Feeling ran high and many fiery speeches were made, Governor Rector addressed the convention in an oratory urging the extension of slavery:

But it soon became evident that a majority of the delegates to the convention did not think that the situation at that time called for secession. The convention voted down a resolution condemning Lincoln's inaugural address, and defeated a conditional ordinance of secession. The opinion seemed to prevail that Arkansas should secede only if the United States' government made war on the Southern states. Still hoping for a compromise settlement that would avoid war, the delegates agreed to go adjourn, subject to recall by the president of the convention, until after the people had voted on the secession question at a special election to be held in August.

Capture of Fort Smith arsenal
Under orders from Confederate President Jefferson Davis, troops controlled by the Confederate government under P. G. T. Beauregard bombarded Fort Sumter in Charleston harbor on April 12, forcing the capitulation of its Federal garrison. In response, President Lincoln called upon the "militia of the several states" to provide 75,000 troops to put down the rebellion. In spite of the fact that Arkansas had yet to officially secede, Governor Rector sensed that the move toward open war would shift public opinion into the secessionist camp and he quickly organized a militia battalion under the command of Solon Borland. The militia was dispatched it to seize the Federal Arsenal at Fort Smith on April 23, 1861. Governor Rector's response to President Lincoln's request for troops was: "The people of this Commonwealth are freemen, not slaves, and will defend to the last extremity their honor, lives, and property, against Northern mendacity and usurpation."

The Ordinance of Secession
The first Arkansas secession convention had pledged the state to "Resist to the last extremity any attempt on the part of such power (President Lincoln) to coerce any state that had succeeded from the old Union". Now, faced with President Lincoln's demand for troops, the convention reconvened in Little Rock and, on May 6, 1861, passed the ordinance of secession by a vote of 69 to 1. Future Governor Isaac Murphy was the only "No" vote. The convention adopted several resolutions explaining why the state was declaring secession. They stated that the primary reason for Arkansas' secession was "hostility to the institution of African slavery" from the free states. The free states' support for "equality with negroes" was another reason. Three years later, one Arkansas man, supporting the view of the secession convention regarding slavery, stated that if the Union were to win the war, his "sister, wife, and mother are to be given up to the embraces of their present dusky male servitors."

Organizing for war 

The Secession Convention continued to meet and began the process of drafting a new state constitution and ordering the state's military affairs. Many in the convention were angry with the way Governor Rector utilized the militia to move the state closer to war by seizing Federal installations. As a result, the constitution sought to limit the power of the Governor by limiting his term to two years, rather than four, and vesting authority for military matters in a three-person board chaired by the Governor. The Military Board was to oversee the organization of a state army; to arm, feed, and clothe the troops; and to call out the forces for such military expeditions as might be necessary to defend the state.

The Secession Convention also adopted an ordinance providing for the organization of an "Army of Arkansas".  The Army was to consist of two divisions: the 1st Division in the western portion of the state and the 2nd Division in the eastern portion of the state. Each division was to be commanded by a brigadier general.

The Convention elected three of its members as commanders of the new army: Major General James Yell of Jefferson County (overall commander) Nicholas B. Pearce, a graduate of West Point and resident of Benton County (commander of the First Division), and Thomas H. Bradley of Crittenden County (commander of the Second Division).

The Secession Convention enacted an ordinance on May 30, 1861, that called upon all the counties in the State to appoint a "home guard of minute men" for local defense, until regular military regiments could be raised and deployed. These Home Guard units were made up of old men and boys who were not eligible for normal military service. Like the militia, the Home Guard units were organized at the county level, with companies being supplied by each township.

Confederate units 

Arkansas formed 48 infantry regiments and over 20 cavalry regiments and 20 artillery batteries for the Confederate States Army. Most of the troops raised in Arkansas before May 1862 were transferred east of the Mississippi River and would eventually comprise a division in the Army of Tennessee. All but one infantry regiment and all of the cavalry and artillery units served most of the war in what was known as the "Western Theater", where there were few battles that were on the scale of those in the "Eastern Theater". Beginning in 1862, the Confederate States west of the Mississippi River were assigned to the Department of the Trans-Mississippi. All of the new unit raised and organized after May 1862 would remain in the Trans-Mississippi for the remainder of the war.

One infantry regiment, the Third Arkansas, served in the eastern theater for the duration of the war, thus making it the state's most celebrated Confederate military unit. Attached to General Robert E. Lee's Army of Northern Virginia, the Third Arkansas would take part in almost every major Eastern battle, including the Seven Pines, Seven Days, Harper's Ferry, Antietam, Fredericksburg, Gettysburg, Chickamauga, Wilderness, and the Appomattox Campaign.

1861 

Once Arkansas left the Union in May 1861, the existing volunteer militia companies were among the first mustered into state service and be formed into new volunteer infantry regiments, also referred to as "State Troops". These new regiments comprised the Provisional Army of Arkansas. In July 1861 an agreement was reached to transfer the existing state forces into the Confederate army. The Second Division of the Army of Arkansas was transferred to the Confederate Army under the command of General William J. Hardee, but before the First Division of the Army of Arkansas could be transferred, it participated in the second major battle of the war near Springfield, Missouri, in August 1861. Arkansas "State Troops" provided the bulk of forces for the Battle of Wilson's Creek Although the battle was a victory for the Confederacy, the Arkansas State Troops moved back to Arkansas and, after a dispute over transfer to Confederate authority, were disbanded. Most remaining Confederate forces in Arkansas were transferred east of the Mississippi River in the fall of 1861 and spent the remainder of the war serving in that theater.

In November 1861, Colonel Solon S. Borland, commanding Confederate forces at Pittman's Ferry received information regarding an impending invasion of Northeast Arkansas and issued an immediate call for militia forces to reinforce his position. The State Military Board authorized the activation of Eighth Brigade of Militia, and one company from the militia regiments of Prairie, Monroe, Poinsett, Saint Francis, and Craighead counties. The units that responded to this call were formed into three regiments of 30 Day Volunteers. Some of these companies later enrolled in regular Confederate service.

The Secession Convention's and Military Board's fears of Arkansas troops being transferred east of the Mississippi quickly became a reality. By the end of September 1861 Brigadier General William J. Hardee had transferred his new command of Arkansas troops east of the Mississippi to join what would become the Confederate Army of Tennessee. Arkansas soon found itself virtually defenseless. Governor Rector's newspaper charged: "The Confederate government has abandoned Arkansas to her fate." By November 1861 Governor Rector reported that 21 regiments had been raised for the war effort, a total of 16,000 men, and an additional 6,000 men were soon to be in the ranks.

1862 
Many of the Arkansas regiments organized in the summer of 1861 would serve under General Albert Sidney Johnston at the Battle of Shiloh in April 1862 and would eventually be assigned to Patrick Cleburne's division of the Army of Tennessee, and the remnants would surrender with that army in North Carolina at the close of the war.

In January 1862 Major General Earl Van Dorn was dispatched to Arkansas to build a new force. He immediately issued a call to Governor Rector for the raising of additional companies. In a proclamation dated January 31, 1862, Governor Rector called for the formation of 100 new companies and four batteries, while noting:

General Van Dorn led his new Army of the West into the Battle of Pea Ridge, March 6–8, 1862. The battle was a major defeat for Southern forces in the Trans-Mississippi Theater and led to the loss of northwest Arkansas. Immediately following the battle of Pea Ridge, Van Dorn was ordered to transfer his forces east of the Mississippi River to reinforce Confederate forces in northern Mississippi, near Corinth. Van Dorn's forces were heavily engaged in operations around Corinth in the summer and fall of 1862. Brigadier General Evander McNair's Arkansas brigade of the Army of the West would eventually find itself assigned to the Army of Tennessee, and its remnants would finally surrender with that army in North Carolina at the close of the war. Other parts of the Army of the West and several Arkansas regiments which had previously served at Fort Donaldson and Island No. 10 would find themselves trapped in the Siege of Vicksburg and the Siege of Port Hudson in the summer of 1863.

As Van Dorn was leaving the state, Major General Samuel Curtis, the victor of the battle of Pea Ridge, began an invasion of Arkansas in early April. He moved his 17,000-man army back into Missouri to take advantage of better transportation routes and headed east. He established his base of supply at Rolla, Missouri. Curtis reached West Plains, Missouri, on April 29 and turned southwards into Arkansas. During the first part of May, Curtis and Steele encountered numerous logistical difficulties. Poor weather, difficult terrain, and lack of consistent resupply slowed their progress. But by May 9, Curtis' large, but ill-supplied, force had emerged from the Ozark foothills onto flat ground at Searcy. It was poised to strike deep into central Arkansas and seize Little Rock itself as soon as supplies were gathered.

Major General Van Dorn left the state, but Brigadier General John S. Roane refused to go with him, declaring that Arkansas troops should be left to defend their state. Van Dorn detached Roane and left him in command of the Arkansas military, but with virtually no organized forces for the defense of the state. Roane approached Governor Rector for assistance in raising new forces. Rector told Roane to stop any troops passing through the state and use them for the state's defense. General Roane set to work immediately in cobbling together a defense to meet the approaching Union Army.  Roane stopped elements of the 12th Texas Cavalry that were bound for the eastern theaters and ordered troops who had made it as far as Memphis, Tennessee, to turn around. Some attempts at recruiting local volunteers were made, but with little success. On May 10, Roane sent Texas cavalry as scouts to determine the federal position. The scouts encountered numerous refugees fleeing the Union Army. The refugees reported that the Union forces numbered about 30,000, mostly German immigrants. Hindman had approximately 1,200 Texas horsemen to confront this force. He ordered cotton stores near Searcy destroyed, and Governor Rector prepared government offices for evacuation. Meanwhile, small advance parties from the Union Army clashed with the Texas scouts between Searcy and Little Rock. On May 19, several companies of the Texas cavalry and a few local Arkansas companies achieved a small, but psychologically important victory over General Curtis's foraging parties at the Battle of Whitney's Lane.

On May 1, 1862, Governor Rector, realizing that Major General Samuel Curtis' army was on the way to capture Little Rock, abandoned the city and moved the state government to Hot Springs, Arkansas. For the first three weeks of May 1862, there was no military or state government in Little Rock. Roane traveled to Pine Bluff and enlisted the help of Arkansas Militia Major General James Yell in recruiting a new Army of the Southwest in the Department of Arkansas. Yell was a "States Defense first" advocate and lent his power to aiding Roane along with Senator Robert W. Johnson, also of Pine Bluff. These three men were the backbone of the newly reconstituted army of the Trans-Mississippi Department. In the meantime, Governor Rector sent dispatches to President Jefferson Davis threatening to secede from the Confederacy unless Davis sent some sort of support. Davis' answer came in the form of the CSS Pontchartrain and CSS Maurepas, which were dispatched to Little Rock. The state government did not return to Little Rock until the Pontchartrain arrived. A week later, on May 31, 1862, Major General Thomas C. Hindman arrived to take command from Roane and ordered all troops in Pine Bluff to Little Rock.

Hindman was dispatched to take command of what had been designated as the Confederate Department of the Trans-Mississippi.  When Hindman arrived, Union forces were still moving south from Batesville and threatening the state capitol of Little Rock.  Hindman found that his command was "bare of soldiers, penniless, defenseless, and dreadfully exposed" to the Federal Army that was approaching dangerously from the northwest. He set to work and issued a series of harsh military edicts, instituting conscription, authorizing guerrilla warfare and requisitioning supplies for the defense of the State.  With the assistance of the Texas troops diverted by General Roane, Hindman commenced a campaign of misinformation designed to mislead Federal authorities about the strength of the state's defenses. Hindman sent a combined force of Texas troops and newly formed and hastily cobbled together Arkansas units to confront Curtis at the Battle of Cotton Plant, on July 7, 1862. This series of events, combined with harassing tactics, confused the Federal authorities, causing them to fear that they did not have an adequate supply line to conquer the state and they soon diverted from a course towards the capital and instead moved to Helena to reestablish a solid supply line.

Through rigorous enforcement of new Confederate conscription laws, Hindman was able to raise a new army in Arkansas in the summer of 1862. Hindman's tactics had questionable legal authority.  The Confederate Conscription Act of April 1862 had expressly forbid the raising of new units through conscription.  The intent of the law had been to provide replacements to the existing Confederate regiments in the field for the losses that they had already experienced through disease, desertion and battlefield loss.  Hindman's problem was that General Van Dorn had taken virtually every organized regiment in the state with him to Mississippi.  Hindman turned a blind eye to this legal challenge and began aggressively recruiting.  To encourage volunteers, Hindman announced that volunteer companies raised before a certain date would be allowed to elect their own officers, as was the custom, while conscript companies would have their officers appointed. Hindman did have a ready supply of experienced officers to help him in his reorganization. In early May 1862, Confederate forces in northern Mississippi underwent an army-wide reorganization due to the passage of the Conscription Act by the Confederate Congress in April 1862. All twelve-month regiments had to re-muster and enlist for two additional years or the duration of the war; a new election of officers was ordered; and men who were exempted from service by age or other reasons under the Conscription Act were allowed to take a discharge and go home. Officers who did not choose to stand for re-election were also offered a discharge. The reorganization was accomplished among all the Arkansas regiments in and around Corinth, Mississippi, in May 1862. During its reorganization, a number of senior officers from the Arkansas regiments east of the Mississippi, such as Colonels James Fleming Fagan, Robert G. Shaver, Simon P. Hughes, and Alexander Travis Hawthorn resigned their original commands and returned to Arkansas and assisted Hindman in organizing new units in the summer of 1862.

Hindman sent numerous requests for arms back across the Mississippi River. Many weapons were transferred to the Trans Mississippi District from Vicksburg in what became known as the "Fairplay Affair." A shipment of 18,000 arms were dispatched to Pine Bluff from Vicksburg, Miss. by way of Monroe, La., but 5,000 of those 18,000 were captured on the steamer Fair Play by Union forces, and 2,500 arms were redirected to Major-General Richard Taylor's army in Louisiana. Only 11,000 arms made it to Pine Bluff. These weapons had come from the arsenal of eastern Confederate states that had been returned to the state arsenals as the Confederates had re-equipped themselves with the better captured Union arms. Most of the guns were castoffs and unusable weapons from the various state armories which had been returned to the armories after the Confederate armies east of the Mississippi had been re-equipped from the "Battlefield Quartermaster" of Seven Days Battles, Second Manassas and Harper Ferry.

The Arkansas secession convention, while drafting the new state constitution in 1861, had shortened the term of office for the governor from four years to two years. This necessitated an election in the fall of 1862. Colonel Harris Flanagin of the 2nd Arkansas Mounted Rifles was elected governor of Arkansas.  After he was recalled from active duty to take office, his administration dealt primarily with war-related measures and maintaining order and continuing government while undergoing an invasion. His administration was faced with shortages of critical items, rising prices, care of fallen soldier's families, and related problems.

Hindman's aggressive tactics caused complaints that he was ruling by martial law, which led the Confederate government to send Lieutenant-General Theophilus H. Holmes to assume command of the newly established Trans-Mississippi Department. Hindman was retained as commander of the 1st Corps, Trans-Mississippi Army, and led this new force, composed largely of conscripts, in an attempt to clear northwest Arkansas of Union forces. Hindman's offensive ended in defeat at Prairie Grove on December 7, 1862.

1863 

The new year did not bring good news to Confederates in Arkansas. When the Emancipation Proclamation went into effect on January 1, 1863, Union forces occupied northwestern Arkansas. Local Union commanders, who had been aggressively enforcing the Confiscation Acts to grant freedom to slaves of rebel owners, put the Proclamation into effect immediately, freeing many slaves in the area. In 1862, the Confederate Army had constructed a massive defensive earthwork at Arkansas Post, on the Mississippi River, known as Fort Hindman. It was located on a bluff 25 feet above the river on the north bank, with a mile view up and downriver.  It was designed to prevent Union forces from going upriver to Little Rock, and to disrupt Union movement on the Mississippi.  On January 9–11 of 1863, Union forces conducted an amphibious assault on the fortress backed by ironclad gunboats as part of the Vicksburg Campaign. Union forces outnumbered the defenders (33,000 to 5,500) and won an easy victory in capturing the post, with most of the Confederate garrison surrendering.

The Battle of Fayetteville occurred on April 18, 1863, when Confederate General William Cabell attacked the federal outpost in Northwest Arkansas. It was a battle between Arkansas Confederates and Arkansas Unionists, a true civil war struggle. The attack was unsuccessful, and the Union forces under Colonial M. LaRue Harrison held the field at the end of the day. However, the attack exposed the weakness of the post, and the Union troops were withdrawn to Missouri a week later.

General Hindman was transferred to a new command back east of the Mississippi in the Army of the Tennessee, leaving Holmes and Major General Sterling Price of Missouri in command in Arkansas. Arkansas troops spent much of the winter and spring in camp near Little Rock. Under pressure from Richmond to attempt to relieve federal pressure on Vicksburg, Mississippi, General Holmes moved his army across the state and attacked the Union supply depot at Helena. The Confederate attack was repulsed at the Battle of Helena on July 3, 1863, which was the same day that Vicksburg fell to Union forces. In late August, 1863, Union forces from Indian Territory moved on Fort Smith and captured the city on September 1, 1863. In July 1862, Lincoln installed Colonel John S. Phelps as Military Governor of Arkansas, though he resigned soon after due to poor health.

With the Union base at Helena now secure, Major-General Frederick Steele decided it was time to seize the state capitol at Little Rock. Price, commanding the District of Arkansas in place of Holmes, opposed Steele's advance with his cavalry forces while strengthening the northern approaches to the city. Clashes occurred at Brownsville, West Point, Harrison's Landing, Reed's Bridge, and Ashley's Mills (or Ferry Landing). Steele ultimately outflanked Price's defensive preparations by crossing the Arkansas River and attacking from the south side of the river. Confederate forces opposed this attack at the Battle of Bayou Fourche, near the current Clinton National Airport on September 10, 1863. Ultimately, Price decided to abandon the city rather than risk being trapped in a siege operation. Confederate forces retreated to southwestern Arkansas and establish winter quarters. Governor Flanagin took the state archives and moved first to Arkadelphia, and then on to Washington in Hempstead County where he set up a new capitol.

After the fall of Little Rock, Governor Flanagin ordered out the militia regiments of Clark, Hempstead, Sevier, Pike, Polk, Montgomery, La Fayette, Ouachita, Union, and Columbia counties and directed them to supply mounted companies for new regiments of state troops. This recruiting method succeeded in supplying several new mounted companies that participated in resisting Union General Steele's Camden Expedition in the spring of 1864.  The fall of Little Rock provided the opportunity to create a new pro-Union state government.

1864 
The fall of the capitol at Little Rock to Union troops in 1863 opened the door to the establishment of a new Union government under Isaac Murphy on April 18, 1864. The Murphy government struggled to gain recognition from Union authorities as the legitimate state government as President Lincoln and radical republicans in congress were battling over terms to be imposed on seceded states. With the state capital and Fort Smith in Union control, Union leaders withdrew many Union forces from Arkansas to reinforce armies operating east of the Mississippi river, leaving the Murphy government powerless in areas beyond the reach of Union garrisons along the Arkansas river valley. Intense guerrilla warfare ensued in the virtual no-mans land north of the Arkansas River and into southern Missouri.

The next major military action in Arkansas was the Camden Expedition (March 23 – May 2, 1864). Steele and his United States Army troops stationed at Little Rock and Fort Smith were ordered to march to Shreveport, Louisiana. There, Steele was supposed to link up with a separate Federal amphibious expedition which was advancing up the Red River Valley. The combined Union force was then to strike into Texas. However, the two pincers never converged, and Steele's columns suffered terrible losses in a series of battles with Confederates led by Sterling Price and General E. Kirby Smith at the Battle of Marks' Mills, Battle of Poison Spring and the Battle of Jenkins' Ferry. Ultimately Union forces managed to escape back to Little Rock where they basically remained for the duration of the war.

The victory by Confederates in the Red River Campaign and its Arkansas segment, the Camden Expedition, opened a brief window of opportunity for Arkansas Confederates. Brigadier General Joseph O. Shelby was dispatched to northeast Arkansas with his cavalry brigade and began recruiting anew. Throughout the summer of 1864, Confederate strength in northeast Arkansas steadily grew with many men who had either deserted or become separated from their previous commands returning to Confederate service. The last formation of new Confederate units occurred during this time with the formation of the 45th through the 48th Arkansas Mounted Infantry units. Several existing Arkansas units were converted to mounted infantry and dispatched to northeast Arkansas.

With these strengthened units, Shelby was able to seriously threaten vital Union lines of communication along the Arkansas River between Helena and Little Rock, and for a time it appeared that the Confederates would mount a serious attempt to retake the Federal held state capitol. However, Confederate authorities in Richmond pressured Smith to dispatch some of his infantry to reinforce Confederate armies east of the Mississippi. This caused an uproar among the Arkansas Confederate infantry and, as a compromise, Smith approved a plan by Price to organize a large-scale cavalry raid into Missouri that would coincide with the U.S. presidential election. Arkansas cavalry played a major part in the Trans-Mississippi Department's offensive operation into Union controlled territory, which lasted from August 29 to December 2, 1864. Following Price's disastrous defeat at Westport on October 23, all Arkansas cavalry units returned to the state where a majority were furloughed for the rest of the Civil War.

1865 

On April 9, 1865, the Third Arkansas was among the regiments that surrendered with the Army of Northern Virginia at Appomattox. The remnants of Patrick Cleburne's division of Arkansas troops surrendered with the Army of Tennessee at Bennett Place near Durham Station, North Carolina, on April 26, 1865. The Jackson Light Artillery was among the last of the Confederate troops east of the Mississippi to surrender. The remnants of the Jackson Light Artillery aided in the defense of Mobile and surrendered with the Department of Alabama, Mississippi, and East Louisiana. The battery spiked its guns and surrendered at Meridian, Mississippi, on May 11, 1865.

The Arkansas infantry regiments assigned to the Department of the Trans-Mississippi were surrendered on May 26, 1865. When the Trans-Mississippi Department surrendered, all of the Arkansas infantry regiments were encamped in and around Marshall, Texas, since war-ravaged Arkansas was no longer able to provide adequate sustenance to the army. The regiments were ordered to report to Shreveport, Louisiana, to be paroled. None of them did so. Some soldiers went to Shreveport on their own to be paroled, but the regiments simply disbanded without formally surrendering.

Most of the Arkansas cavalry units were surrendered by Brigadier General M. Jeff Thompson, Commander of the Army of the Northern Sub-District of Arkansas. General Thompson agreed to surrender his command at Chalk Bluff on May 11, 1865, and agreed to have his men assemble at Wittsburg and Jacksonport to lay down their arms and receive their paroles. The cavalry units formally surrendered and were paroled at either Wittsburg on May 25 or at Jacksonport on June 5.  Ultimately Thompson surrendered about seventy-five hundred men all total that were under his command consisting of 1,964 enlisted men with 193 officers paroled at Wittsburg in May 1865 and 4,854 enlisted men with 443 officers paroled at Jacksonport on June 6, 1865. Many smaller commands surrendered at various Union posts, including Fort Smith, Pine Bluff and Little Rock in May and June 1865.

The United States government organized the Fort Smith Council at Fort Smith in September 1865. The purpose of the series of meetings was to discuss the future treaties and land allocations following the close of the American Civil War and involved Indian tribes east of the Rockies. Under the Military Reconstruction Act, Congress readmitted Arkansas to the Union in June 1868.

Battles in Arkansas
The following is a list of American Civil War engagements fought in Arkansas between 1862 and 1865:

Notable Confederate leaders from Arkansas
Arkansans of note during the American Civil War include Confederate Major-General Patrick Cleburne. Considered by many to be one of the most brilliant Confederate division commanders of the war, Cleburne is often referred to as "The Stonewall of the West."  Also of note is Major-General Thomas C. Hindman, a former United States Representative, who commanded Confederate forces at the Battle of Cane Hill and Battle of Prairie Grove.

Notable Union leaders from Arkansas
Although Arkansas sided with the Confederacy, not all Arkansans supported the Confederate cause. Beginning with the fall of Little Rock to Union forces in 1863, Arkansans supporting the Union formed four infantry regiments, four cavalry regiments, and an artillery battery to serve in the United States Army. Additionally, six infantry regiments and one artillery battery of African Descent were attributed to the state. Later these units that were originally designated as the "1st-6th Arkansas Volunteers of African Descent" were re-designated as the 46th, 54th, 56th, 57th, 112th and 113th United States Colored Troops.

Restoration to Union
As stipulated by the Reconstruction Acts during the Reconstruction period, Arkansas and Mississippi were part of the Fourth Military District of the U.S. Army. At various times, the district was commanded by generals Edward Ord, Alvan Cullem Gillem, and Adelbert Ames.

After meeting the requirements of Reconstruction, including ratifying amendments to the US Constitution to abolish slavery and grant citizenship to former slaves, Arkansas's representatives were readmitted to Congress. The state was fully restored to the United States on June 22, 1868, becoming the second former Confederate state to gain readmission to the Union (after Tennessee in July 1866).

Image gallery

See also

 Arkansas Civil War Confederate Units
 Arkansas Militia in the Civil War
 Confederate States of America - animated map of state secession and confederacy
 List of Arkansas Union Civil War Units

References

Footnotes

Citations

Sources

 
 
 Christ, Mark K., and Patrick G. Williams, eds. I Do Wish This Cruel War Was Over: First Person Accounts of Civil War Arkansas from the Arkansas Historical Quarterly (University of Arkansas Press, 2014)
 Gigantino, James J. ed. Slavery and Secession in Arkansas: A Documentary History (2015)

Further reading

 
 
 Barnes, Kenneth C. "The Williams Clan: Mountain Farmers and Union Fighters in North Central Arkansas." Arkansas Historical Quarterly (1993): 286-317. in JSTOR
 Baxter, William. Pea Ridge and Prairie Grove. Fayetteville: University of Arkansas Press, 2000. .
 
  and  
 Bradbury, John F. "Buckwheat Cake Philanthropy": Refugees and the Union Army in the Ozarks." Arkansas Historical Quarterly (1998): 233-254. in JSTOR
 Burford, Timothy Wayne, and Stephanie Gail McBride. The Division: Defending Little Rock, August 25–September 10, 1863. Jacksonville, AR: WireStorm Publishing, 1999.
 
 
 
 
 
 
 DeBlack, Thomas A. With Fire and Sword: Arkansas, 1861–1874. Fayetteville: University of Arkansas Press, 2003.
 
 
 Harper, Stephanie. "Snapshot Within a Portrait: The Civil War in Clark County, Arkansas, 1861–1865." (2001). online
 Huff, Leo E. "The Memphis and Little Rock Railroad during the Civil War," Arkansas Historical Quarterly (1964) 23#3 pp. 260–270 in JSTOR
 Joslyn, Mauriel. A Meteor Shining Brightly: Essays on the Life and Career of Major General Patrick R. Cleburne. Macon, GA: Mercer University Press, 2000. .
 Lovett, Bobby L. "African Americans, Civil War, and Aftermath in Arkansas." Arkansas Historical Quarterly (1995): 304-358. in JSTOR

External links

 Government
 Civil War Collection at Arkansas State Archives (ahc.digital-ar.org)
 Civil War trails in Arkansas at Arkansas Department of Parks & Tourism
 General information
 Arkansas Civil War Sesquicentennial Commission historical markers at The Historical Marker Database (HMdb.org)
 Civil War Timeline at Encyclopedia of Arkansas

 

 
.American Civil War
American Civil War by state
American Civil War
 
Trans-Mississippi Theater of the American Civil War